Swaraj (Swaraj: Bharat Ke Swatantrata Sangram ki Samagra Gatha) is an Indian Hindi-language historical TV serial that aired on DD National from 14 August 2022. With this serial, Doordarshan has once again tried to bring alive the tales of courage of more than 550 freedom fighters. It is a Government of India project and produced by Contiloe Pictures.

Cast

Main
 Jason Shah as Vasco Da Gama
 Manoj Joshi as Story Narrator
 Aamir Rafiq as Harry Burnett Lumsden
Harshita Ruhela 
 Hrishitaa Bhatt as Rani Lakshmi Bai
 Vishal Nayak as Sadat Ali Khan
 Momin Zaidi as British Officer
Akshay Sethi as Sidhu Murmu
Amit Dolawat as Kanhu Murmu
Jason Tham as Narendrajeeth
Ram Yashwardhan as Bakht Khan
Rushiraj Pawar as Udmi Ram
Urvashi Pardeshi as Ratni Devi;Udmi Ram's Wife

Recurring
 Vinod Kapoor as Aaliya Rama Raya
 Jiten Lalwani as Dayaram Singh
 Ishaan Singh Manhas as Nana Saheb Peshwa
 Suhasi Goradia Dhami as Velu Nachiar 
Rakesh Kukreti as Muthu Vaduganatha Periyavudaya Thevar 
Himanshu Malhotra as  Veerapandiya Kattabomman 
 Ankur Nayyar as Pazhassi Raja (Kerala Varma) 
 Amit Pachori as Puli Thevar
 Javed Pathan as Wazir
 Navi Bhangu as Tatya Tope
 Rohit Bharadwaj as Mattadin
 Megha Chakraborty as Debi Chaudhrani
 Siddhantsinh Jadeja as British Officer
 Karan Suchak as Mangal Pandey
 Gajendra Chauhan as Samuthiripaad (MaanVikram)
 Chaitanya Choudhury as Kanhoji Angre
 Saurabh Gokhale as Shivaji Maharaj
 Vineet Kakkar as U Tirot
 Sahil sagar as Spy
 Sahil Miglani as General Neel
 Momin Zaidi as British Officer
 Pankaj Avadhesh Shukla as Lakhan Dubey
Alok Narula as Bindi tiwari
Ishan Manham as Nana Saheb
Krishna Shetty as Tatya tope
Pranav Mishra as Azimulla Khan
Bhavya Mishra as Young Azimulla Khan
Shubam Goswami as Mohammad Ali Khan
Ram Awana as Sita Ram

References

External links
 

Indian historical television series
2022 Indian television series debuts
DD National original programming